Bad Kreuznach is a Verbandsgemeinde ("collective municipality") in the district of Bad Kreuznach, Rhineland-Palatinate, Germany. The seat of the Verbandsgemeinde is in the town Bad Kreuznach, itself not part of the Verbandsgemeinde. The municipalities lie south and east of the town of Bad Kreuznach. The entire Verbandsgemeinde is 73.7 square kilometers large and has about 9,000 inhabitants.

The Verbandsgemeinde Bad Kreuznach consists of the following Ortsgemeinden ("local municipalities"):

 Altenbamberg
 Biebelsheim
 Feilbingert
 Frei-Laubersheim
 Fürfeld
 Hackenheim
 Hallgarten
 Hochstätten
 Neu-Bamberg
 Pfaffen-Schwabenheim
 Pleitersheim
 Tiefenthal
 Volxheim

External links
Verbandsgemeinde Bad Kreuznach
www.KH-lokal.de - local community with more than 1.800 links to homepages of Bad Kreuznach-Land

Verbandsgemeinde in Rhineland-Palatinate